Elections in Kazakhstan are held on a national level to elect a President and the Parliament, which is divided into two bodies, the Majilis (Lower House) and the Senate (Upper House). Local elections for maslihats (local representative bodies) are held every five years.

Elections are administered by the Central Election Commission of the Republic of Kazakhstan.

There are 6 political parties in Kazakhstan. Kazakhstan’s political opposition is the most developed in the region in terms of its organizational abilities and resources.

None of the elections held in Kazakhstan have been considered free or fair by Western countries or international observers with issues noted including ballot tampering, multiple voting, repression of opposition candidates and press censorship. However, robust reforms have been implemented since 2019 and the OSCE ODI stated in its post-2021 parliamentary election report that "candidates were able to campaign freely." The OSCE Office for Democratic Institutions and Human Rights has deployed election monitors to Kazakhstan at the invitation of the government for observation of parliamentary and presidential elections since 1999.

Election procedures and technology

Prior to the 2012 parliamentary elections, many Kazakh voters were offered a choice of voting on electronic voting machines or on paper ballots.  At least some of
the ballot boxes used in Kazakhstan are transparent in order to defend against ballot box stuffing.  Each polling place was equipped with both a large ballot box and smaller mobile ballot boxes.  The latter are designed to be carried, by poll-workers, to voters outside the polling
place.
This is an alternative to offering absentee ballots or proxy voting for voters with disabilities that prevent them from going to the polls.

Electronic voting in Kazakhstan is based on the AIS "Sailau" electronic voting system developed in Belarus and Kazakhstan.  This system is best described as an indirect-recording electronic voting system, as opposed to the DRE voting machines that have been more widely studied.  In this system, the touch-screen voting terminal in the voting booth serves as a ballot marking device, recording selections on a smart card.  The voting terminal itself retains no record of the vote after the voter takes the smart card.  The voter then takes the smart card containing the cast ballot record to the computer at the registration table that serves as the electronic ballot box where the permanent record of the vote is retained and tabulated.

On November 16, 2011, Kuandyk Turgankulov, head of the Central Election Commission, said that the Sailau system would be discontinued because the voters prefer paper ballots, the political parties do not trust it, and the country lacks the funds required to update the system.

Election Financing
Candidates for elected office in Kazakhstan can receive state financial support to cover campaign costs. In Senate elections, each candidate receives about $2,170.

In Senate races, the state budget pays for each candidate’s 15-minute TV address (115 thousand tenge, approx. $303), 10 minutes on the radio (60 thousand tenge, approx. $158), 2 articles in the media (105 thousand tenge, approx. $276), hall rent for meeting with the voters (20 thousand tenge, approx. $53), publication of printed campaign materials (25 thousand tenge, approx. $66) and traveling (for Oblasts - 70 thousand tenge, approx. $184; for Astana and Almaty cities - 35 thousand tenge, approx. $92).

Observation

There have been several international election observation missions organised in Kazakhstan. The OSCE has observed the elections.

Presidential elections

Kazakhstan's president is elected by the people and serves for at most two five-year terms. Term limits were removed for the incumbent Nursultan Nazarbayev on 18 May 2007, when parliament also voted to reduce the term length from seven to five years.

Early presidential elections were called by President Nazarbayev and were held on April 26, 2015. President Barack Obama sent a letter to President Nazarbayev congratulating him on his reelection in the April 26 election.

After President Nazarbayev' resignation in March 2019, snap presidential elections were held on June 9, 2019 with former Senate Chair Kassym-Jomart Tokayev emerging as the winner. In September 2022, the parliament approved to change the term length from five to seven years while lowering the amount of terms to one. In the same month, early presidential elections were called for 20 November 2022.

2019 Presidential election

2022 Presidential election

Parliamentary elections 

The legislature, known as the Parliament (Parlamenti), has two chambers.

The Assembly (Mazhilis) has 107 seats, elected for a five-year term, 98 elected in general elections by proportional representation with 7% threshold and 9 elected by the Assembly of Kazakhstani Nation.

The Senate has 47 members, 40 of whom are elected to six-year terms in double-seat constituencies by the local assemblies, half renewed every two years, and 7 presidential appointees.

Rural elections
Citizens for the first time voted to elect local officials on July 25, 2021. Officials were previously appointed to their positions.

International criticisms
As of March 2015, none of the elections held in Kazakhstan have been considered free or fair by Western countries or international observers. The 1999 Presidential election attracted criticism from the United States and the Organization for Security and Co-operation in Europe (OSCE) who considered that harassment and intimidation of opposition candidates and supporters and the disqualification of an opponent of Nazarbayev had made a meaningful election impossible. The OSCE criticised the 2011 presidential election, citing a lack of press freedom, transparency and competition. Following the 2005 election, they noted a number of issues, including ballot tampering, multiple voting, intimidation and harassment of opposition candidates and their supporters, media bias and official restrictions on free expression.

Latest election

Preliminary results

See also
 Electoral calendar
 Electoral system

References

External links
The Central Election Commission of the Republic of Kazakhstan
Kazakhstan Elections Adam Carr's Election Archive
OSCE reports on Kazakhstani elections

 
Elections